Diapheromerini is a tribe of walkingsticks in the family Diapheromeridae. There are at least 30 genera Diapheromerini.

Genera
These 37 genera belong to the tribe Diapheromerini:

 Alienobostra Zompro, 2001 c g s
 Bacteria Berthold, 1827 c g s
 Bactricia Kirby, 1896 c g s
 Bostra Stål, 1875 c g s
 Calynda Stål, 1875 c g s
 Caribbiopheromera Zompro, 2001 c g s
 Charmides Stål, 1875 c g s
 Clonistria Stål, 1875 c g s
 Diapheromera Gray, 1835Gray, 1835 i c g b s
 Dyme Stål, 1875 c g s
 Globocalynda Zompro, 2001 c g s
 Globocrania Hennemann & Conle, 2011 c g s
 Laciniobethra Conle, Hennemann & Gutiérrez, 2011 c g s
 Laciphorus Redtenbacher, 1908 c g s
 Libethra Stål, 1875 c g s
 Libethroidea Hebard, 1919 c g s
 Litosermyle Hebard, 1919 c g s
 Lobolibethra Hennemann & Conle, 2007 c g s
 Manomera Rehn & Hebard, 1907Rehn & Hebard, 1907 i c g b s
 Megaphasma Caudell, 1903Caudell, 1903 i c g b s
 Nanolibethra Conle, Hennemann & Gutiérrez, 2011 c g s
 Oncotophasma Rehn, 1904 c g s
 Paracalynda Zompro, 2001 c g s
 Paraclonistria Langlois & Lelong, 1998 c g s
 Paraphanocles Zompro, 2001 c g s
 Phanocles Stål, 1875 c g s
 Phanoclocrania Hennemann & Conle, 2011 c g s
 Phanocloidea Zompro, 2001 c g s
 Phantasca Redtenbacher, 1906 c g s
 Pseudobactricia Brock, 1999 c g s
 Pseudoclonistria Langlois & Lelong, 2010 c g s
 Pseudosermyle Caudell, 1903Caudell, 1903 i c g b s
 Pterolibethra Günther, 1940 c g s
 Sermyle Stål, 1875Stål, 1875 i c g b s
 Spinopeplus Zompro, 2001 c g s
 Trychopeplus Shelford, 1909 c g s

Data sources: i = ITIS, c = Catalogue of Life, g = GBIF, b = Bugguide.net, s = Phasmida Species File

References

Further reading

External links
 

Phasmatodea tribes